Sir Edgar Rees Jones   (27 August 1878 – 16 June 1962) was a Welsh barrister and Liberal Party politician. He was the Member of Parliament (MP) for Merthyr Tydfil from 1910 to 1918, and then for Merthyr from 1918 to 1922. During World War I he served as head of the Priorities Division of the Ministry of Munitions.

Biography

Early life and background
Edgar Rees Jones was born on 27 August 1878, the son of the Baptist minister Morgan Humphrey Jones and Margaret Ann Jones of Gorwel, Rhondda. A Welsh speaker, he was educated in law at the University of Wales and Cardiff University College, receiving his Bachelor of Arts degree in 1900 and Master of Arts degree in 1903; his MA thesis was on "Political theories in England in the Seventeenth Century". In September 1919, he married Lillian Eleanor May, daughter of George Brackley. He was known to reside at 28 Westminster Mansions, Great Smith Street, Westminster.

Career
Jones came to prominence during David Lloyd George's education revolt campaign in 1903, and was elected at the January 1910 general election as one of the two Members of Parliament for Merthyr Tydfil. He held that seat until the constituency was abolished at the 1918 general election, when he was elected as a Coalition Liberal for the new Merthyr division. He did not stand for re-election in 1922, and although he stood in Salford South in 1923 and Gower in 1931, he never returned to the House of Commons.

He was once a civil servant in the Ministry of Munitions and served as head of the Priorities Division of this ministry during World War I. He was chairman of the National Food Canning Council (NFCC).
	
Along with fellow Coalition Liberal Lewis Haslam of the Newport constituency, Jones played a minor role in the discussions behind the Government of Ireland Bill. Haslam in particular was strongly opposed to giving the Irish Parliament control of its own taxes.

References

External links

 
 
 Sir Edgar Rees Jones at the National Portrait Gallery

1878 births
1962 deaths
Welsh barristers
UK MPs 1910
UK MPs 1910–1918
UK MPs 1918–1922
Liberal Party (UK) MPs for Welsh constituencies
Alumni of the University of Wales
People from Rhondda
Knights Commander of the Order of the British Empire